Ticket to Mayhem is the second studio album by American thrash metal band Whiplash. It was released on Roadrunner Records in October 1987 and follows 1986's Power and Pain. In 1989, the band released a follow-up album, Insult to Injury.

The opening and closing tracks, both called "Perpetual Warfare", are simply sound effects of guns, explosions, and fighter planes.

In 1998, Displeased Records rereleased Ticket to Mayhem and Power and Pain together on one CD.

Track listing
All songs written by Tony Portaro, except where noted.

Credits
 Tony Portaro – vocals, guitar
 Tony Bono – bass
 Joe Cangelosi – drums
 Recorded and mixed at Morrisound Recording, Tampa, Florida
 Produced by Dan Johnson
 Engineered by Scott Burns
 Mixed by Dan Johnson and Jim Morris
 Mastered by Mike Fuller at Fullersound, Miami, Florida

References

External links
Roadrunner Records band page
Encyclopaedia Metallum band entry
BNR Metal discography page
Displeased Records band page

1987 albums
Whiplash (band) albums
Roadrunner Records albums